Alicia Aylies (born 21 April 1998) is a French singer, model, and beauty pageant titleholder who was crowned Miss France 2017. Aylies had previously won Miss French Guiana 2016, becoming the first representative from French Guiana to win Miss France. She later represented France at Miss Universe 2017.

After completing her reign as Miss France, Aylies began a music career. She released her debut single "Mojo" with Scorpio Music in December 2021.

Life and career
Aylies was born on 21 April 1998 in Fort-de-France to Martiniquais parents. Her father, Philippe Aylies, works as an environmental manager, and her mother, Marie-Chantal Belfroy, is a driving school instructor. Aylies is an only child.

When she was two years old, her parents separated and Aylies moved to Matoury, French Guiana with her mother. She attended school in Remire-Montjoly and graduated from lycée with a diploma in science in 2016. After graduating, she began studying law at the University of French Guiana.

Pageantry

Miss France 2017 
Aylies represented French Guiana at the Miss France 2017 pageant. On 17 December 2016, she was crowned Miss France by Miss France 2016 Iris Mittenaere in Montpellier. She is the first Miss French Guiana to be crowned Miss France.

Miss Universe 2017 
As Miss France 2017, Aylies represented France at the Miss Universe 2017 pageant and was one of the heavy favourites but was unplaced.

Post-pageantry
Aylies embarked on a music career in 2021, with the release of her debut single "Mojo" in December 2021, by French music label Scorpio Music.

Personal life
In December 2022, Aylies announced that she was pregnant with her first child.

Discography

Singles

References

External links

1998 births
21st-century French women singers
Living people
French beauty pageant winners
French Guianan female models
French Guianan musicians
French people of Martiniquais descent
French women pop singers
Miss France winners
Miss Universe 2017 contestants
People from Fort-de-France
People from Matoury
University of French Guiana alumni